Zea is a Canadian short film, directed by André Leduc and Jean-Jacques Leduc and released in 1981.

Premise
Set to a recording of the Ralph Vaughan Williams composition "Fantasia on a Theme by Thomas Tallis", the five-minute film presents a close-up depiction of a kernel of corn slowly heating up in oil until it bursts into popcorn.

Production
A high-speed camera shooting 400 feet per second was used. The film had a budget of $73,585 (.

Accolades
The film was screened at the 1981 Cannes Film Festival, where it was co-winner of the Jury Prize in the Short Film Competition. It won the Genie Award for Best Theatrical Short Film at the 3rd Genie Awards in 1982.

References

Works cited

External links
 
Zea on NFB.ca
Zea on TCM.com

1981 films
Canadian short documentary films
Best Theatrical Short Film Genie and Canadian Screen Award winners
1981 short films
National Film Board of Canada short films
Quebec films
Popcorn
1980s Canadian films
Short Film Palme d'Or winners